The 2014–15 Egyptian Premier League was the 56th season of the Egyptian Premier League, the top Egyptian professional league for association football clubs, since its establishment in 1948. The season started on 15 September 2014 and concluded on 3 August 2015.

Teams

A total of 20 teams contested the league, including 17 sides from the 2013–14 season and 3 promoted from the 2013–14 Egyptian Second Division. This includes the promotion play-off winners (Ala'ab Damanhour, Al Assiouty Sport and Al Nasr).

Al Assiouty Sport and Al Nasr made their Premier League debut. Zamalek drew the highest attendance, 20,000 spectators in a match in February.

Stadiums and locations

1 Al Masry's original stadium is Port Said Stadium, but due to the Port Said Stadium riot the Egyptian Football Association decided that Al Masry would not play their home matches at Port Said Stadium until 2016, and instead they will play at Ismailia Stadium.

Results

League table

Result table

Notes:

Top goalscorers
.

References

1
1
Egypt